Dangerously Yours is a 1933 American Pre-Code comedy film directed by Frank Tuttle, starring Warner Baxter, Miriam Jordan and Herbert Mundin.

Cast
 Warner Baxter as Andrew Burke  
 Miriam Jordan as Claire Roberts  
 Herbert Mundin as Grove  
 Florence Eldridge as Jo Horton 
 Florence Roberts as Mrs. Lathem  
 William B. Davidson as George Carr  
 Arthur Hoyt as Dr. Ryder  
 Mischa Auer as Kassim  
 Nella Walker as Lady Gregory  
 Edmund Burns as Tony  
 Robert Greig as White 
 Tyrell Davis as Theodore Brill

References

Bibliography
 Aubrey Solomon. The Fox Film Corporation, 1915–1935: A History and Filmography. McFarland, 2011.

External links
 

1933 films
1933 comedy films
1930s English-language films
American comedy films
Films directed by Frank Tuttle
Fox Film films
American black-and-white films
1930s American films